Ngopa is a town in the Saitual District of Mizoram, India. It is located in the Ngopa R.D. Block, and it serves as headquarters for that block. It is also an important administrative centre containing important government offices.

Nearby Towns and Villages
The names and distances of nearby villages of Ngopa are: Lamzawl (13 km), North East Khawdungsei (18 km), Chiahpui (23 km), Khawkawn (30 km), Teikhang (30 km), Kawlbem (23 km), Mimbung (35 km), Pawlrang (29 km), Hliappui (36.8 km), and Rabung (25.1 km or 16 mi). The nearest towns are Khawzawl (80 km) and Champhai (125 km).

People

The population of Ngopa is made up different ethnic groups, but mainly of Mizo; they call themselves 'Ngopians.'  They speak their own language, called Mizo, and the families are set up by patriarch. There are few government servants or businessmen. The livelihood of the majority depends upon agriculture.

According to the 2011 census, 945 families resided in Ngopa. The population was 4,155, of which 2,168 were males, and 1,987 were females. There were 607 children under the age of six, which makes up 14.61% of the total population of the village. Average Gender Ratio of Ngopa is 917, which is lower than the Mizoram state average of 976. Child Gender Ratio for Ngopa was 927, lower than the Mizoram average of 970.

Transport

Air 

Ngopa is connected by air transport through the helicopter service of Pawan Hans. The service began in 2013, connecting Ngopa with Aizawl. Every Thursday, a helicopter comes from Thuampui Helipad in Aizawl and brings passengers to and from Ngopa. The fare from Ngopa to Aizawl (so also Aizawl to Ngopa) costs Rs. 1800/- for each passenger.

Road 

Ngopa is situated on National Highway 102B which connects Churachandpur in Manipur to Kawlkulh in Mizoram. Ngopa is connected to Aizawl, the state capital by North Eastern Council Road. This road  connects Mizoram with Manipur, and it is one of the most important roads that link Mizoram and Manipur. At present, nine maxi cabs (sumo) provide service between Ngopa and Aizawl. The sumo fare for each passenger is Rs.350. An Aizawl Maxi cab ticket can be booked from Metro, Chanmari, Ramhlun Road. There are also some medium-sized vehicles which service regularly to carry goods and passengers to and from Ngopa. Furthermore, many maxi cabs which service between Churuchandpur (Manipur), neighbouring villages of Ngopa, regularly run through Ngopa.

In the Town 
Privately owned auto-rickshaws are widely available. Cars, bicycles, and scooters are also useful modes of transportation.

Educational Institutions

Elementary 

There are four primary schools operated by the government. They are Government Primary School I, Government Primary School II, Government Primary School III, and Government Primary School IV. Two English medium comprehensive schools, primary and middle, are owned by the churches, Presbyterian and Roman Catholic respectively. These English medium schools are Presbyterian School, Comfort Intensive School, and St. Joseph's School. There are two government middle schools. They are Middle School I, located on the north side, and Middle School II, located the south side.

Secondary and Higher Secondary 
There are two high schools: Government Ngopa High School, and K. Lalthlamuana Memorial High School, operated by Grand in Aid system. Ngopa Higher & Secondary School was established by the local community and operated from their contributions for a long time. But fortunately the government accepted the responsibility, and it is now operated by Grand in Aid system. It offers only Arts stream. Ngopa Higher Secondary School is an IGNOU Study Centre. Many students have earned their diplomas and master's degrees from this institution.

Government Offices
There are many government offices in Ngopa, including the Sub Divisional Office (Civil) and Block Development office. Hrianghmun, Teikhang, Kawlbem, Lamzawl, Vaikhawtlang, Selam, Pawlrang, Changzawl, Hliappui, Hliappui, and Saichal are the villages within Ngopa Block.

Also in Ngopa are the Sub-Divisional Office (PWD), Sub-Divisional Office (PHE), Sub-Divisional Office (P&E), Sub-Post Office, Police Station, and Block Resource Center. And there is a Community Health Center (CHC) equipped with 30 beds. In addition to these departments, State Bank of India (SBI), Mizoram Rural Bank (MRB), Agriculture, SSA (BRC), Assam Riffle, BSNL, School Education, Environment & Forest, Food & Civil Supply,  Horticulture, Industries, Minor Irrigation, Postal, Power & Electricity, Public Health Engineering, Public Works, SIB, Social Welfare (ICDS), Soil & Water Conservation, Tourism, and Veterinary & Animal Husbandry departments are found in Ngopa. Ngopa's Pin Code is 796290. Other villages in Post Office 796290 are Kawlbem, Khawkawn, Mimbung, Ngopa, and N.E. Khawdungsei.

Religion

Almost all the people living in Ngopa are Christians. The Presbyterian Church of India has four local churches in Ngopa, namely- Ngopa, Ngopa Chhimveng, Ngopa North and Ngopa Venglai. The Salvation Army also has two corps: Nagoya and Ngopa Chhimveng. United Pentecostal Church (NEI) has two local churches, Ngopa and Ngopa Chhimveng. In addition to the Roman Catholic Church, Seventh-Day Adventist Church and Christ Redemption Church also have congregations there.

Ngopa is the headquarters of Ngopa Pastorate (Presbyterian).  The local churches within Ngopa Pastorate are Ngopa, Lamzawl, Ngopa Chhimveng, Ngopa North, and Ngopa Venglai. Reverend Vanlalhuma is the pastor presently in charge of Ngopa Pastorate. The Salvation Army also had a Commanding Post in Ngopa, which is overseen by the Commanding Officer. Moreover, United Pentecostal Church and Christ Redemption churches also use Ngopa as their pastorate headquarters.

Water, Electricity and Other Essential Supply System

Water 
Ngopa has an enviable water supply system, which runs with the help of gravitational force. More than half of the families have private water connection, and public water points are available in the streets. There are very few families still depending upon natural water points.

Electricity 
Ngopa receives electrical power through 11 kV transmission line from Khawzawl Power Station. It is distributed again from Ngopa Power Substation to Ngopa and neighbouring villages. Normally, Ngopians receive a regular supply of electric power.

Other Essential Supplies 
There is one petroleum oil filling station operated by a private firm and one LPG Agent. The petrol station and the LPG agent feed Ngopa and its neighbouring villages. There are two shops that sell electronic goods like washing machines, televisions, etc. There are about four hardware stores, two wholesale shops, and many small variety shops which serve the people's needs.

Recreational Places and Community Halls

Recreational Places 
There are several recreational places in Ngopa. There are three football fields, three tennis courts, three volleyball courts, two indoor stadiums for badminton, a basketball court, and a table tennis hall. In the northern part of town there is a mini sports complex with football grounds, a tennis court, and two volleyball courts. Ngopa is well known in Mizoram for its talented tennis players.

Community Halls 
Three community halls in Ngopa are overseen by YMA, and two conference rooms/halls are owned by government departments. The YMA community halls are Jubilee Hall, Ngopa Chhimveng Hall, and Zawlbuk. Jubilee Hall has the highest seat capacity, while Zawlbuk is the newest and the most furnished community hall. There is also an SSA Block Resource Centre Hall and an NREGS Conference Hall.

Places of interest

Watch Tower 

Watch Tower, Ngopa's 80th-Year Monument is constructed on a hilltop. This symbol for the people of Ngopa receives many visitors. A shiny steel cross, the symbol  of Christianity, has been placed on the top of the tower. In memory of those who have already answered the heavenly call, loved ones have sponsored the placement of granite plates embedded in the wall which bear touching words.

FK Tea's Estate 

F. K. Tea Estate is another place of interest that is popular with tourists. It is located in the northern side of the town and is about three kilometers from Ngopa. The good metal road runs across it. It is one of the largest tea gardens in Mizoram. There is also a facility on the property where green tea leaves are processed and made ready for use. Mizo Tea is produced, sold, and distributed from here to different parts of the state. This tea garden and processing facility are owned and operated privately by F. Kapsanga and his family.

Tuani Lung 

Tuani Lung is an ancestral place connected with one of Mizo's famous love stories, Tuani leh Chhawrtuineihlala. It is located north of Ngopa, about ten kilometers from town. In memory of the two lovers, Tuani and Chhawrtuineihlala, two stones were erected. YMA, Ngopa Branch is responsible for the preservation and oversight of this ancestral site. Students and tourists often visit.

Lengteng  
Lengteng, the second highest point in Mizoram is not far from Ngopa. However, the peak is not approachable by vehicle. To reach the peak from Ngopa by foot take at least half a day. It is located in the southern side of the famous 'Sialkal' range, which is also known as Himalaya of Mizoram. Lengteng and its surrounding area is covered by thick forest, and the area is proclaimed as a reserved sanctuary for animals.

Important Rivers

Tuivai 
The Tuivai River, which originates from Manipur state, is the largest river near Ngopa; it runs towards the south. Tuivai is very important for the stability and growth of the economy of Ngopa. Every year huge amounts of sand (aggregate) are collected from the Tuivai River for building purposes. The river is a source of good quantity fish possessing a unique flavor. The freshwater snail of Tuivai also has a unique, tantalizing flavor, best among the freshwater snails found in Mizoram rivers. Since the 1980s, there has been proposal on the table to construct a dam on the Tuivai River for hydroelectric power production. Enthusiasm for the project has dwindled and been rekindled over the years and is still under consideration today. Most of the residents in the area who of the teenagers at the time of the first proposal are becoming grandparents. Though they have not completely abandoned hope for construction of hydro-electric power plant, the hope that still lingers is becoming faint.

Tuiphal 
Tuiphal is the second largest river that runs in the south toward the west. The Tuiphal River provides mineral resources like sand (aggregate) and stones for the Ngopians. Tuiphal has a small, easily cultivated plain which provides paddy fields and supplies fresh fish to Ngopians.

Tuila 
The Tuila River runs on the eastern side toward the north. Although not a large river, small plains at the river's edge provide one of the rice bowls of Ngopa. And the fish of Tuila possess an indescribably wonderful flavor.

Tuithil 
Tuithil is a small river which runs toward the south. Even though it is the smallest river in the area, it has the largest plain, which served as the rice bowl of Ngopa.

References

Villages in Ngopa block